Helen Johnson may refer to:
 Helen Johnson (artist), Australian artist
 Helen Kendrick Johnson, American writer, poet, and activist
 Judith Wood, American film actress, born Helen Johnson
 Helen Johnson-Leipold, née Johnson, American billionaire businesswoman

See also
 Helene Johnson, African-American poet